Baghaichhari is an upazila of Rangamati District in the Division of Chittagong, Bangladesh.

Geography
It has a total area of 1931.28 km2.

Demographics

According to the 2011 Bangladesh census, Baghaichari Upazila had 20,171 households and a population of 96,899, 20.5% of whom lived in urban areas. 10.9% of the population was under the age of 5. The literacy rate (age 7 and over) was 41.9%, compared to the national average of 51.8%.

Administration
Baghaichari Upazila is divided into Baghaichari Municipality and eight union parishads: Amtali, Baghaichari, Bongoltali, Khedarmara, Marisha, Rupokari, Sajek, and Sharoyatali. The union parishads are subdivided into 19 mauzas and 303 villages.

Baghaichari Municipality is subdivided into 9 wards and 14 mahallas.

Places to visit 

 Konglak Haphong

See also
 Upazilas of Bangladesh
 Districts of Bangladesh
 Divisions of Bangladesh

References

 
Upazilas of Rangamati Hill District